Le Bon Marché (lit. "the good market", or "the good deal" in French) is a department store in Paris. Founded in 1838 and revamped almost completely by Aristide Boucicaut in 1852, it was one of the first modern department stores. It was a member of the International Association of Department Stores from 1986 to 2011.

Now the property of LVMH, it sells a wide range of high-end goods, including food in an adjacent building at 38, rue de Sèvres, called La Grande Épicerie de Paris.

History
A novelty shop called Le Bon Marché was founded in Paris in 1838 to sell lace, ribbons, sheets, mattresses, buttons, umbrellas and other assorted goods.  It originally had four departments, twelve employees, and a floor space of three hundred square meters. The entrepreneur Aristide Boucicaut became a partner in 1852, and changed the marketing plan, instituting fixed prices and guarantees that allowed exchanges and refunds, advertising, and a much wider variety of merchandise. The use of fixed prices replaced the system of haggling over prices, then commonly used in dry goods stores. The annual income of the store increased from 500,000 francs in 1852 to five million in 1860. In 1869 he built a much larger building at 24 rue de Sèvres on the Left Bank, and enlarged the store again in 1872, with help from the engineering firm of Gustave Eiffel, creator of the Eiffel Tower. The income rose from twenty million francs in 1870 to 72 million at the time of Boucicaut's death in 1877, at which time the management of the store continued by his wife, Marguerite Boucicaut.  The floor space had increased from three hundred square meters in 1838 to fifty thousand, and the number of employees had increased from twelve in 1838 to 1888. in 1879.  Boucicaut was famous for his marketing innovations; a reading room for husbands while their wives shopped; extensive newspaper advertising; entertainment for children; and six million catalogs sent out to customers. By 1880 half the employees were women; unmarried women employees lived in dormitories on the upper floors.

The architecture of the store was innovative for its time; the 1869 store was constructed by the architect Louis-Auguste Boileau. Alexandre Laplanche ornamented Boileau's ironwork technology. Louis-Charles Boileau, his son, continued the store in the 1870s, consulting the firm of Gustave Eiffel for parts of its structure. Louis-Hippolyte Boileau, the grandson of Louis-Auguste Boileau, worked on an extension to the store in the 1920s.

The building inspired the design of the Bon Marche store in Sydney, designed by Arthur Anderson, as well as the Galerias Pacifico shopping centre in Buenos Aires, originally called Argentine Bon Marché.

Zola's novel Au Bonheur des Dames was inspired by the story of Le Bon Marche.

Operations
In 1922, when the decorative arts were at their high point in France, the Pomone design and decorating department was established, following the trend of other Parisian department stores. From 1923 to 1928, Paul Follot (1877–1941) was its director, followed by René-Lucien Prou (1889–1948) and Albert-Lucien Guénot (1894–1993) up to 1955. Today's home-furnishings inventory primarily consists of brand names but not white goods.

See also
 La Samaritaine
 Galerías Pacífico
 Galeries Lafayette
Foy & Gibson

References

Further reading
 Sally Aitken, "Seduction in the City: The Birth of Shopping" (Television Documentary) 
 Byars, Mel. "Follot, Paul" "Pomone," "Guénot, Albert-Lucien," and "Prou, René-Lucien," The Design Encyclopedia, New York: The Museum of Modern Art, 2004, pp. 234, 289, 585, 598–599.
 Sennott, R Stephen ed., "Department Store," Encyclopedia of 20th-Century Architecture, New York: Fitzroy Dearborn, vol. 1, A–F, p. 356
 Zola, Émile, Au Bonheur des Dames, Paris: Charpentier, 1883. First serialized in the periodical Gil Blas and then published as the 11th novel in Zola's Rougon-Macquart series. Is one of Zola's more positive novels about changes in society during the Second Empire; documents the birth of modern retailing and changes in city planning and architecture; considers feminism; deconstructs desire in the marketplace; and tells in a Cinderella format the life of the Boucicauts who, in the novel, appear as Octave Mouret and Denise Baudu.   
 Michael B. Miller, The Bon Marché: Bourgeois Culture and the Department Store, 1869–1920, Princeton: Princeton University, 1981

External links

  Le Bon Marché official website
 Cape (with Au Bon Marché label), ca. 1890-1905, in the Staten Island Historical Society Online Collection Database

Buildings and structures in Paris
Buildings and structures in the 7th arrondissement of Paris
Department stores of France
Food halls
LVMH brands
Shops in Paris